Arash Vafadari is an Iranian businessman who returned to Iran after the 2000s. He is notable for being part of the first wave of returnees during the post Khatami period. He has been featured in the Persian language press including Tejarat-e-Farda. He is also known for speaking publicly on the business community in Iran, including the first  EU-Iran Forum hosted in London. Vafadari has also become one of the main proponents of promoting post-sanctions investment in Iran appearing for comment in the Guardian Newspaper
He is founder and chairman of the board on ManaPayam

References

Iranian businesspeople
Living people
Year of birth missing (living people)